The Ella Island Formation is a geologic formation in Greenland. It preserves fossils dating back to the Cambrian period.

See also 
 List of fossiliferous stratigraphic units in Greenland
 Buen Formation

References

Further reading 
 M. Stein and J. S. Peel. 2008. Perissopyge (Trilobita) from the lower Cambrian (Series 2, Stage 4) of North America and Greenland. GFF 130:71-78
 C. B. Skovsted. 2006. Small shelly fauna from the upper Lower Cambrian Bastion and Ella Island Formations, North-East Greenland. Journal of Paleontology 80(6):1087-1112
 C. B. Skovsted and L.E. Holmer. 2005. Early Cambrian brachiopods from north-east Greenland. Palaeontology 48(2):325-345
 C. Skovsted. 2003. Mobergellans (Problematica) from the Cambrian of Greenland, Siberia and Kazakhstan. Paläontologische Zeitschrift 77(2):429-443 

Geologic formations of Greenland
Cambrian Greenland
Limestone formations
Shallow marine deposits
Cambrian southern paleotemperate deposits
Paleontology in Greenland